Bigfoot is an unincorporated community and census-designated place (CDP) in Frio County, Texas, United States. The population was 450 at the 2010 census, up from 304 at the 2000 census.

History
The first settlement at Bigfoot was made in the 1860s, but the community was called "Connally's Store" until the post office was established in 1883. The present name is in honor of Texas Ranger William A. A. "Bigfoot" Wallace, a former resident of the town.

Geography
Bigfoot is located in the northeast corner of Frio County at  (29.055333, -98.847011). It is bordered to the north by Medina County and to the east by Atascosa County. Texas State Highway 173 passes through the northeast part of the CDP, leading northwest  to Devine and southeast  to Jourdanton.

Demographics

As of the census of 2000, there were 304 people, 110 households, and 91 families residing in the CDP. The population density was 12.7 people per square mile (4.9/km2). There were 127 housing units at an average density of 5.3/sq mi (2.1/km2). The racial makeup of the CDP was 81.58% White, 16.12% from other races, and 2.30% from two or more races. Hispanic or Latino of any race were 44.74% of the population.

There were 110 households, out of which 31.8% had children under the age of 18 living with them, 66.4% were married couples living together, 12.7% had a female householder with no husband present, and 16.4% were non-families. 14.5% of all households were made up of individuals, and 9.1% had someone living alone who was 65 years of age or older. The average household size was 2.76 and the average family size was 3.01.

In the CDP, the population was spread out, with 25.0% under the age of 18, 7.6% from 18 to 24, 25.7% from 25 to 44, 29.3% from 45 to 64, and 12.5% who were 65 years of age or older. The median age was 39 years. For every 100 females, there were 105.4 males. For every 100 females age 18 and over, there were 101.8 males.

The median income for a household in the CDP was $19,375, and the median income for a family was $17,083. Males had a median income of $22,917 versus $28,750 for females. The per capita income for the CDP was $14,250. About 23.7% of families and 29.1% of the population were below the poverty line, including 38.2% of those under the age of eighteen and 27.5% of those 65 or over, the area code here is 830.

Education
Bigfoot is served by the Devine Independent School District.

References

Census-designated places in Frio County, Texas
Census-designated places in Texas
Unincorporated communities in Frio County, Texas
Unincorporated communities in Texas